Edward Paul "Ned" Kirby (January 10, 1928 – January 3, 2017) was an American politician and lawyer from Massachusetts.

Education
He graduated from the College of the Holy Cross in 1949 and Boston College Law School in 1952.

Military service
He served in the United States Army during the Korean War. He served with the Army Judge Advocate General Corps. He later served as a Captain in the Army Reserves.

Legal career
He practiced law and served as Town Counsel for Whitman, Massachusetts.

Political career
From 1961 to 1967, Kirby was a member of the Massachusetts House of Representatives. From 1969 to 1977 he was a Plymouth County Commissioner. From 1981 to 1993 he served in the Massachusetts Senate. He was the Third Assistant Minority Leader from 1983 to 1989 and again from 1991 to 1993. He served in all positions as a Republican. He ran in the 2004 State Representative General Election for the 7th Plymouth district but lost to Kathleen M. Teahan. He served on the Whitman Republican Town Committee. He founded the Plymouth County Development Council.

Political positions & notable legislation
He was pro-life. In 1989, he was opposed to a gay rights bill which would have prohibited discrimination against gays and lesbians in housing, employment and credit. Some believe this action may have costed him his seat in the 1992 State Senate election to Therese Murray. He successfully helped pass legislation which went toward economic development for Whitman, the South Shore, the return of commuter rail service from Boston to Plymouth, the Big Dig, and the Old Colony Lines.

Later career
He was appointed as a Administrative Law Judge by Governor Bill Weld, and was an Appeals Judge in Workers Compensation.

Personal life
He and his wife Mary Alice Kirby had three children.

Death
He died on January 3, 2017.

References

1928 births
2017 deaths
Boston College Law School alumni
College of the Holy Cross alumni
Republican Party Massachusetts state senators
20th-century American lawyers
21st-century American lawyers
21st-century American politicians
20th-century American politicians
21st-century American judges
Republican Party members of the Massachusetts House of Representatives
People from Whitman, Massachusetts
United States Army personnel of the Korean War
United States Army officers
20th-century American judges
Military personnel from Massachusetts